Puryear may refer to:

People
 Eugene Puryear (born 1986), American activist and politician
 Martin Puryear (born 1941), American sculptor
 Richard Clauselle Puryear (1801–1867), American politician

Places
 Puryear, Tennessee